The lazuline sabrewing (Campylopterus falcatus) is a species of hummingbird in the "emeralds", tribe Trochilini of subfamily Trochilinae. It is found in Colombia, Ecuador, and Venezuela.

Taxonomy and systematics

The lazuline sabrewing is monotypic.

Description

Both sexes have a black decurved bill and a white spot behind the eye. Males' upperparts are glittering green that is bluer on the crown. Their throat and breast are glittering dark violet-blue that becomes glittering blue towards the green belly. Their tail is chestnut with wide bronze-green tips on the central pair of feathers. Females' upperparts are like the male's. They have a glittering bluish throat and the rest of their undeparts are pale gray with green spots on the flanks. Their tail is like the male's except there is less green at the tips of the central feathers.

Distribution and habitat

The lazuline sabrewing is found in the mountains of north-central and western Venezuela, the Sierra de Perijá on the Venezuela-Colombia border, the Sierra Nevada de Santa Marta and Eastern Andes of Colombia, and into Ecuador as far south as Napo Province. It inhabits semi-deciduous montane forest, the edges of plantations, the lower reaches of páramo, and gardens.

Behavior

Movement

The lazuline sabrewing is believed to be sedentary.

Feeding

The lazuline sabrewing forages for nectar mostly from the understory to the forest's mid level, usually by trap-lining but sometimes also defending patches of flowers. In addition to nectar, it also feeds on insects captured in the air or gleaned from vegetation.

Breeding

The lazuline sabrewing's breeding season in the Sierra de Perijá appears to include June and in northern Venezuela probably includes October. Nothing else is known about its breeding phenology.

Vocalization

The male lazuline sabrewing sings "chik, it, chik, it splek, chat, seet, chik, seet, chik, it, chik, it..., etc., with many variations", usually from a somewhat exposed perch at medium height.

Status

The IUCN has assessed the lazuline sabrewing as being of Least Concern, though its population size and trend are unknown. No immediate threats have been identified. In the northern Andes it is considered uncommon and patchily distributed. It is somewhat sensitive to habitat changes, but "readily accepts man-made habitats like flowering gardens and plantations" and occurs in many protected areas.

References

External links

 

lazuline sabrewing
Birds of the Colombian Andes
Birds of the Venezuelan Andes
Birds of the Sierra Nevada de Santa Marta
Birds of the Venezuelan Coastal Range
lazuline sabrewing
Taxonomy articles created by Polbot